The Staffordshire Senior Challenge Cup is a football cup tournament based in the county of Staffordshire in England first competed for in 1877–78. Organised by the Staffordshire Football Association, it is competed for by a mix of clubs from Staffordshire and the surrounding areas.  Both professional and amateur clubs may enter. In the modern age however professional teams such as Stoke City and Port Vale, the main clubs in Staffordshire, usually field a reserve team as they place more prestige on their respective leagues and professional cup competitions.  This has left the door open for non-league sides to have more success in the cup as it is classed as a bigger achievement for them to win it.

In recent years the entries from clubs from neighbouring counties have virtually been phased out.  Most County FAs now have their own separate Senior Cup competitions and this, coupled with the formation of the West Midlands county, has meant the entries for the Cup are quite low in some seasons.  This has seen Market Drayton Town and Shifnal Town both enter since the turn of the millennium to make up the numbers, despite not being located in Staffordshire.

From the 2008–09 season the Staffordshire FA introduced a cut off point whereby teams lower than level 9 in the English football league system can not compete in the Senior Cup.  Teams below the level of the North West Counties League Premier Division and Midland Football Alliance now compete in the sister competition the Staffordshire Senior Vase.

Stoke City are the most successful sides in the competition's history with 19 wins.

Historically the non-league side with the most wins is Stafford Rangers who have won the cup 11 times since the Second World War.

The most successful side from outside what is traditionally classed as Staffordshire are Kidderminster Harriers from Worcestershire, who won the competition 4 times in the 1980s.  Worcester City and Redditch United have also won the competition from this county and Macclesfield Town and Northwich Victoria from neighbouring Cheshire

Winners

Results by team

References

External links
County Cups page on the Staffordshire County FA website

County Cup competitions
Football in Staffordshire
Recurring sporting events established in 1877